In physics and mechanics, mass distribution is the spatial distribution of mass within a solid body. In principle, it is relevant also for gases or liquids, but on Earth their mass distribution is almost homogeneous.

Astronomy
In astronomy mass distribution has decisive influence on the development e.g. of nebulae, stars and planets.
The mass distribution of a solid defines its center of gravity and influences its dynamical behaviour - e.g. the oscillations and eventual rotation.

Mathematical modelling
A mass distribution can be modeled as a measure. This allows point masses, line masses, surface masses, as well as masses given by a volume density function. Alternatively the latter can be generalized to a distribution. For example, a point mass is represented by a delta function defined in 3-dimensional space. A surface mass on a surface given by the equation  may be represented by a density distribution , where  is the mass per unit area.

The mathematical modelling can be done by potential theory, by numerical methods (e.g. a great number of mass points), or by theoretical equilibrium figures.

Geology
In geology the aspects of rock density are involved.

Rotating solids
Rotating solids are affected considerably by the mass distribution, either if they are homogeneous or inhomogeneous - see Torque, moment of inertia, wobble, imbalance and stability.

See also
 Bouguer plate
 Gravity
 Mass function
 Mass concentration (astronomy)

External links
 Mass distribution of the Earth

Mechanics
Celestial mechanics
Geophysics
Mass